Vital Voranaŭ (born 18 March 1983) is a Belarusian-Polish playwright, translator, writer, academic, and poet. He is a co-founder of Belarusian Cultural and Scientific Centre in Poznań and the publishing house Bely Krumkacz. He was born in Minsk, Byelorussian SSR and now lives in Poland. He completed his doctorate at Masaryk University in Czech Republic and teaches Irish literature and history of Belarus in Southwestern College in the United States.

He translated Samuel Beckett's play Waiting for Godot and Alan Milne's story Winnie the Pooh into the Belarusian language. Together with Britpop band Hair Peace Salon, he participated in the musical projects of the public campaign Budźma Biełarusami! “Tuzin. Perazagruzka” (with Tuzin.fm) with Belarusian lyrics to the song “Studzień”, “Budzma The Best Rock / Budzma The Best Rock/New” (with European Radio for Belarus) with a literary translation of the words of the song “Ciańki”, and cooperated with Atlantica, Tanin Jazz, and other bands too.

In 2013, he published a "Zeszytów Poetyckich" (Notebooks Poetic) collection of prose "The Grand Duchy of Belarus" that was translated by Monika Uranek, edited by David Jung with graphics by Vladimir Bludnik.

In 2015, he published his novel Szeptem.

External links 
 Official website (Polish)

References 
This article is based in part on material from the Polish Wikipedia

1983 births
Living people
21st-century Belarusian writers
Belarusian male poets
Belarusian translators
Translators to Polish
Belarusian dramatists and playwrights
Polish people of Belarusian descent
Polish-language writers
Writers from Minsk
Polish emigrants to the United States
Southwestern College (Kansas) faculty
American male poets
21st-century American poets
21st-century translators
21st-century American male writers